Agil Shirinov  (Azerbaijani: Aqil Muxtar oğlu Şirinov) Assistant Professor at the Department of Religious Studies. Rector of Azerbaijan Institute of Theology

References 

Living people
1979 births
People from Kalbajar District
Azerbaijani professors